Below are the squads for the 2019 CONIFA European Football Cup, held in Abkhazia from 2–9 June 2019. Although the tournament was originally scheduled to include 12 teams, withdrawals from Sardinia, County of Nice, Luhansk PR and Donetsk PR led to the tournament being reduced to 8 teams. Squads were published on the eve of the tournament in late May 2019.

Group A

Artsakh

Head coach: Slavik Gabrielyan

Abkhazia

Head coach: Beslan Ajinjal

Chameria

Head coach: Bardhil Minxhaj

Sápmi

Head coach: Jon Steinar Eriksen

Group B

Padania

Head coach: Arturo Merlo

South Ossetia

Head coach: Soslan Kochiev

Székely Land

Head coach: József Gazda

Western Armenia

Head coach: Harutyun Vardanyan

References

CONIFA European Football Cup squads